Arciellia is a genus of flies in the family Dolichopodidae, endemic to Hawaii. It is part of the Eurynogaster complex of genera. The genus is named in honor of Robert Cyril Layton Perkins, and incorporates the phonetic sounds of his initials "R.C.L.".

Species
 Arciellia dolichostoma (Hardy & Kohn, 1964)
 Arciellia flaviventer (Hardy & Kohn, 1964)
 Arciellia xanthopleura (Hardy & Kohn, 1964)

References

Hydrophorinae
Dolichopodidae genera
Insects of Hawaii
Endemic fauna of Hawaii